The National Radio Museum is a museum about radio broadcasting in Minxiong Township, Chiayi County, Taiwan.

History
The museum building was originally used for the Minxiong Broadcasting Bureau during the Japanese rule which were built in 1938 and came into operation on 28 September 1940. It was used by the Japanese government as psychological warfare broadcasting during World War II. After the Chinese Civil War in 1949, it became the base for Radio Taiwan International propagating psychological warfare broadcasting towards Mainland China. In 1993, the building became a local cultural center with the Department of Cultural and Creative Development. In 1999, the National Radio Museum was established on the building.

Galleries
 Transparent Broadcast Room
 Live Antique Transmitter Room
 Special Exhibition Room

Exhibitions
The museum exhibits various artifacts and materials on the broadcasting and radio history of Taiwan, including classified intelligence materials used previously.

Transportation
The museum is accessible within walking distance north from Minxiong Station of the Taiwan Railways.

See also
 List of museums in Taiwan

References

External links

 

1999 establishments in Taiwan
Museums established in 1999
Radio Museum
History of radio
Radio in Taiwan
Museums in Chiayi County
Telecommunications museums